Garry Thomas Morse is a Canadian poet and novelist. He is a two-time nominee for the Governor General's Award for English-language poetry, at the 2011 Governor General's Awards for Discovery Passages and at the 2016 Governor General's Awards for Prairie Harbour, and a two-time ReLit Award nominee for his fiction works Minor Episodes / Major Ruckus in 2013 and Rogue Cells / Carbon Harbour in 2014.

He is of Kwakwaka'wakw descent, and Discovery Passages centred on the historical banning of the traditional Kwakwaka'wakw potlatch and its cultural and social impact on the First Nation.

He has worked as an editor for Talonbooks and Signature Editions. Originally from British Columbia, he is currently based in Winnipeg.

Works

Poetry
Transversals for Orpheus (LINEBooks, 2006)
Streams (LINEBooks, 2007)
After Jack (Talonbooks, 2010)
Discovery Passages (Talonbooks, 2011)
Prairie Harbour (Talonbooks, 2016)
Safety Sand (Talonbooks, 2017)
Scofflaw (Anvil Press, 2021)

Fiction
Death in Vancouver (2009)
Minor Episodes / Major Ruckus (2012)
Rogue Cells / Carbon Harbour (2013)
Minor Expectations (2014)
Yams Do Not Exist (2020)

References

21st-century Canadian poets
21st-century Canadian novelists
Canadian male poets
Canadian male novelists
First Nations poets
First Nations novelists
Kwakwaka'wakw people
Writers from British Columbia
Living people
21st-century Canadian male writers
21st-century First Nations writers
Year of birth missing (living people)
Writers from Winnipeg